The 36 is a bus service operated by The Harrogate Bus Company, which links Leeds, Harewood and Harrogate with Ripley and Ripon. It is operated by a fleet of high-specification Wright Gemini 3 bodied Volvo B5TL double-deck vehicles, branded in a red and black livery.

The service is an example of a premium service characterised by more luxurious vehicles compared to those used on other commuter lines, which in combination with a high service frequency has significantly increased ridership and influenced the modal split in favour of public transport.

History 
Trains on the Leeds to Northallerton Railway had provided the main service between Leeds and Ripon between 1848 and 1967, until passenger services were cut back to Harrogate, following the infamous Beeching cuts. Since then, Ripon has only been served by bus services, with Harrogate and Knaresborough being the nearest rail stations to the city.

The 36 was originally operated by the West Yorkshire Road Car Company from the mid 1960s, with the route running between Vicar Lane in Leeds and Ripon Railway Station. However, most journeys only operated between Leeds and Harrogate.

Route 36 began operating using a fleet of Leyland Lynxes. In the 1990s, they were replaced by a fleet of Wright Endurance bodied Volvo B10Bs, Wright Renown bodied Volvo B10BLEs and Alexander Royale bodied Volvo Olympians.

In October 2003, Harrogate & District relaunched route 36 with fourteen Wright Eclipse Gemini bodied Volvo B7TLs with leather seats. The improvements lead to an increase in patronage by 18% in 2006 alone. In 2010, the fleet was refurbished and remodelled with a new livery and 2+1 seating on the upper deck, as well as launching under a new brand name – "36 City Connect".

In January 2016, route 36 was again relaunched with fourteen new Wright Eclipse Gemini 3 bodied Volvo B5TLs, fitted with coach-style leather seating, WiFi, USB charging points, an on-board library and audio-visual next stop information. To coincide with this, it also launched under a new brand name – "The 36: Riding Redefined".

In September 2021, a night service was reintroduced on Saturdays.

Funding from the UK Government's Zero Emission Bus Regional Area (ZEBRA) fund was secured in May 2022 to aid Transdev Blazefield and North Yorkshire County Council in the electrification of the 36, which will see nineteen battery electric double-decker buses with pantograph chargers delivered to replace the existing diesel Volvo B5TLs on the service. These are expected to enter service in 2024.

Notes

References

External links

 The Harrogate Bus Company website
 Timetable and route map

36 Harrogate
Transport in Harrogate
Transport in Leeds
Ripon